Under the Red Robe is a 1937 British / American film directed by Victor Sjöström. Previously filmed as a 1923 silent directed by Alan Crosland. Before the films a play had been produced on Broadway in 1896-97 starring Viola Allen and William Faversham.

Plot summary 
The film is based on the 1894 novel by Stanley J. Weyman and is set during the religious wars of early 17th century France; events in the novel itself means it can be dated to the autumn of 1630.

Notorious gambler and dreaded swordsman Gil de Berault returns to Paris after carrying out a mission for the 'Red Robe' or Cardinal Richelieu and finds him concerned by growing opposition from French Protestants or Huguenots in the south. He also warns de Berault dueling has been outlawed and henceforth punishable by death but Gil promptly disobeys the law and is sentenced to be executed as a result. The Cardinal offers de Berault a pardon if he is able to capture the Protestant Duc de Foix who is organizing plans for an uprising. Gil agrees, travels to the duke's home and is allowed to stay as a guest, but the duke's wife and his sister Lady Marguerite immediately suspect he is a spy. Nevertheless, he makes good progress but then falls in love with Marguerite, forcing him to choose between conscience and self-interest.

Cast 

Conrad Veidt as Gil de Berault
Annabella as Lady Marguerite of Foix
Raymond Massey as Cardinal Richelieu
Romney Brent as Marius
Sophie Stewart as Elise, Duchess of Foix
Wyndham Goldie as Edmond, Duke of Foix
Lawrence Grant as Father Joseph
Baliol Holloway as Clon
Shale Gardner as Louis
Frank Damer as Pierre
James Regan as Jean
Edie Martin as Maria
Haddon Mason as Count Rossignac
J. Fisher White as Baron Breteuil
Graham Soutten as Leval
Anthony Eustrel as Lieutenant Brissac
Desmond Roberts as Capt. Rivarolle
Ralph Truman as Captain at Castle
Eric Hales as Lieutenant at Castle

References

External links 

1937 films
1930s English-language films
American black-and-white films
Films based on British novels
Films directed by Victor Sjöström
1937 adventure films
Films set in the 1620s
Sound film remakes of silent films
British remakes of American films
20th Century Fox films
British adventure films
British black-and-white films
Cultural depictions of Cardinal Richelieu
1930s British films